Matthew Bentley (born 23 May 1998) is an English professional footballer who plays as a forward for Richmond Kickers in USL League One. Bentley played college soccer for Missouri State University.

Career

Amateur and college 
Born in Greater London, Bentley went to Trinity Catholic High School, Woodford Green near Woodford Green during his teenage years. Upon graduation, Bentley would move to the United States to play college soccer for the West Virginia Wesleyan Bobcats for his freshman through junior seasons. In his time at West Virginia Wesleyan, Bentley made 54 appearances, scoring 25 goals.

Ahead of his senior season, Bentley transferred from West Virginia Wesleyan to Missouri State University. During the 2019 NCAA Division I men's soccer season, Bentley helped Missouri State achieve a program-best 18–1–1 record, including their first ever top-10 ranking from United Soccer Coaches. Bentley finished with 15 goals in 20 appearances for the Bears. His performance earned him a First-Team All-American honor from United Soccer Coaches, for being one of the top college soccer players in the United States. Bentley became the first footballer from Missouri State University to earn the honor.

Professional 
On 13 January 2020 Bentley was selected by Major League Soccer club, Minnesota United FC, in the fourth round with the 88th overall pick in the 2020 MLS SuperDraft, however, after being with the club during pre-season for a month, he was released by United on 23 February 2020.

Following the release from Minnesota United, Bentley returned to his native England where on 21 August 2020, he signed with Basildon United of the Isthmian League, the seventh division of English football. Bentley never played a competitive match for them, due to COVID-19, and subsequently left the club. On 25 February 2021, Bentley transferred to fellow Isthmian League side, Hornchurch, where he played with the club until the conclusion of the 2020–21 Isthmian League.

Following the conclusion of the Isthmian League season, Bentley returned to the United States for the summer and joined Lionsbridge FC of USL League Two, the fourth division of American soccer, for the 2021 season. With Lionsbridge, Bentley made 16 appearances, scoring nine goals, and providing three assists. Following the conclusion of the USL League Two season, Bentley returned to his native England to play for Dover Athletic of the National League, where he was announced as a signing on 22 September 2021. With Dover, Bentley made 7 total appearances.

On 26 November 2021, Bentley joined Leatherhead of the Isthmian League.

Ahead of the 2022 USL League One season, Bentley, returned to the United States again, and signed a professional contract with the Richmond Kickers on 16 December 2021. On 2 April 2022, Bentley made his professional debut for the Kickers against FC Tucson, coming on in the 68th minute for Dakota Barnathan. In the 81st minute of the match, Bentley scored his first professional goal, en route to a 4–0 victory.

Honours 
Individual
 United Soccer Coaches First-Team All-American: 2019

References

External links 
 Matthew Bentley at Missouri State Athletics

1998 births
Living people
English footballers
Footballers from Woodford, London
Soccer players from West Virginia
Association football forwards
All-American men's college soccer players
National League (English football) players
Isthmian League players
USL League One players
USL League Two players
Basildon United F.C. players
Dover Athletic F.C. players
GPS Portland Phoenix players
Hornchurch F.C. players
Leatherhead F.C. players
Lionsbridge FC players
Minnesota United FC draft picks
Missouri State Bears soccer players
Richmond Kickers players
West Virginia Wesleyan Bobcats soccer players
English expatriate footballers
English expatriate sportspeople in the United States
Expatriate soccer players in the United States